Abant Izzet Baysal University is a public university in Bolu, Turkey. It was founded on 3 July 1992 by Izzet Baysal. It has campuses in the city center and three districts of Bolu (Gerede, Mengen, Mudurnu). The main campus of the university, namely the İzzet Baysal Campus, is located in Gölköy, which is 8 km from the city center. The university comprises 16 faculties, 1 institute, 1 school, 8 vocational schools, and 20 research centers. 1.539 faculty members and 1.176 administrative staff.

Academics

Institutes
 Institute of Education Sciences
 Institute of Health Sciences
 Institute of Science and Technology
 Institute of Social Sciences

Faculties
 Faculty of Agriculture and Natural Sciences
 Faculty of Architecture
 Faculty of Communication
 Faculty of Dentistry
 Faculty of Economics and Administrative Sciences
 Faculty of Education
 Faculty of Engineering
 Faculty of Fine Arts
 Faculty of Health Sciences
 Faculty of Law
 Faculty of Medicine
 Faculty of Science and Letters
 Faculty of Sports Sciences
 Faculty of Technology
 Faculty of Theology
 Faculty of Tourism

Colleges
 Gerede in the School of Applied Sciences
 School of Foreign Languages

Vocational Schools
 Bolu Vocational School
 Bolu Technical Sciences Vocational School
 Gerede Vocational School
 Mehmet Tanrıkulu Health Services Vocational School
 Mengen Vocational School
 Mudurnu Süreyya Astarcı Vocational School
 Seben İzzat Baysal Vocational School
 Yeniçağa Yaşar Çelik Vocational School

See also
Abant İzzet Baysal University SK (women's hockey)
List of forestry universities and colleges

References

References 
 Abant Izzet Baysal University

External links 
 Abant Izzet Baysal University
  Erasmus for Incoming Students to AİBÜ

 
Educational institutions established in 1992
Buildings and structures in Bolu Province
1992 establishments in Turkey